There have been two baronetcies created for persons with the surname Lockhart, one in the Baronetage of Nova Scotia and one in the Baronetage of the United Kingdom. Both creations are extinct.

The Lockhart, later Lockhart-Ross Baronetcy, of Carstairs in the County of Lanark, was created in the Baronetage of Nova Scotia on 28 February 1672. For more information on this creation, see Lockhart-Ross baronets.

The Lockhart Baronetcy, of Lee in the County of Lanark, was created in the Baronetage of the United Kingdom on 24 May 1806 for Alexander Lockhart, Member of Parliament for Berwick-upon-Tweed and a member of the extended Lockharts of Lee family. The title became extinct on the death of the fifth Baronet in 1919.

Lockhart, later Lockhart-Ross baronets, of Carstairs (1672)
see Lockhart-Ross baronets

Lockhart baronets, of Lee (1806)
Sir Alexander Macdonald Lockhart, 1st Baronet (died 1816)
Sir Charles Macdonald Lockhart, 2nd Baronet (1799–1832)
Sir Norman Macdonald Lockhart, 3rd Baronet (1802–1849)
Sir Norman Macdonald Lockhart, 4th Baronet (1845–1870)
Sir Simon Macdonald Lockhart, 5th Baronet (1849–1919)

See also
Sinclair-Lockhart baronets
Lockhart-Denham baronets

References

Extinct baronetcies in the Baronetage of Nova Scotia
Extinct baronetcies in the Baronetage of the United Kingdom